Brian Rosales Sarracent (born 7 March 1995) is a Cuban footballer who plays as a defender.

References

External links

1995 births
Living people
Inter Miami CF II players
USL League One players
Cuban footballers
Cuba youth international footballers
Association football defenders
Cuban expatriate footballers
Cuban expatriate sportspeople in the United States
Expatriate soccer players in the United States
FC Matanzas players
2015 CONCACAF U-20 Championship players